is a  mountain on the border of Yamanashi and Shizuoka prefectures in Japan. At the base of the mountain stretches the Asagiri Plateau, which stretches until Mount Fuji. It is the highest peak in the Tenshi Mountains.

Naming
There are two stories behind the naming of the mountain, which have opposing meanings. The first story says that the name was derived from the mountain having absolutely no trees (木無し kenashi, lit. "treeless"). The second story says that the name came from the mountain having many trees (木成し kenashi, lit. "abundant trees"). Through the years, the kanji for the name has changed to the current 毛無, which means "hairless."

Gallery

References

Kenashi, Mount
Kenashi, Mount